The 1906 Arkansas Cardinals football team represented the University of Arkansas during the 1906 college football season. The Razorbacks compiled a 2–4–2 record and were outscored by their opponents by a combined total of 70 to 45.

In January 1906, Arkansas hired Frank Longman, who had played at the fullback position under Fielding H. Yost at Michigan, as the football coach. Longman remained the football coach at Arkansas for two years before moving on to Notre Dame where he led the Fighting Irish to an 11–1–2 record during the 1909 and 1910 seasons.

Schedule

References

Arkansas
Arkansas Razorbacks football seasons
Arkansas Cardinals football